Kilburn High Road railway station is a London Overground station on the London Euston to Watford DC Line near the south end of the Kilburn High Road, London NW6 in the London Borough of Camden.

History
Kilburn High Road railway station opened in 1852 as Kilburn & Maida Vale station by the London and North Western Railway (LNWR). At the beginning of the 20th century the station had platforms on all four lines out of Euston but with the construction of the Euston to Watford DC Line the local service took over the slow main line platforms, the slow (semi-fast) main line services were diverted through what had been the fast main line platforms and the fast main lines were moved southward. The slow (previously fast) main line platforms were almost entirely demolished during the electrification of the West Coast Main Line, with the last platform building disappearing in the 1980s when the LNWR platform canopies were removed. The current footbridge and street-level buildings are not so much the result of modernisation but of three or four major fires which have occurred here since the early 1970s.

Services
The off-peak service on all days of the week in trains per hour is:
 4 tph to 
 4 tph to

Use by London Underground
The station is occasionally used as a reversing point on the London Underground network by out-of-service Bakerloo line trains when they cannot enter the LU platforms at Queens Park station due to planned engineering work or failures, and/or are prevented from reversing in the Up DC line platform there. The fourth rail (bonded to the traction current return rail) continues towards Kilburn High Road to permit these movements, but the carrying of passengers to Kilburn High Road by LU tube trains is not permitted as the platform height is matched to Network Rail trains (platforms on this line north of Queens Park station are positioned at a "transition" height which is higher than that for normal LU platforms and lower than NR platforms). There are also one or two "rusty rail" journeys made by LU trains each day to keep the fourth rail clean for the relatively infrequent unscheduled diverted LU trains. Kilburn High Road appears on non-public internal London Underground (LU) maps and documents for this purpose.

Connections
London Buses routes 16, 31, 32, 98, 206, 316, 328, 332 and 632 and night routes N16, N28, N31, and N98 serve the station.

References

External links

Railway stations in the London Borough of Camden
DfT Category E stations
Former London and North Western Railway stations
Railway stations in Great Britain opened in 1852
Railway stations served by London Overground
Kilburn, London
1851 establishments in England